Each of the 48 states of the United States of America plus several of its territories and the District of Columbia issued individual passenger license plates for 1957.

In 1956, the U.S. states and Canadian provinces came to an agreement with the American Association of Motor Vehicle Administrators, the Automobile Manufacturers Association and the National Safety Council that standardized the size for license plates for vehicles (except those for motorcycles) at 6 inches (15 cm) in height by 12 inches (30 cm) in width, with standardized mounting holes, which has been the standard size for North American license plates since.

Passenger baseplates

Non-passenger plates

See also

Antique vehicle registration
Electronic license plate
Motor vehicle registration
Vehicle license

References

External links

1957 in the United States
1957